Leave to Remain is the sixth studio album by Kathryn Williams released on CAW Records on 1 October 2006. It was her first to feature Kate St John who would produce her next solo album, The Quickening, in 2010.

The track 'Stevie' on the album refers to the poet and novelist Stevie Smith with its chorus echoing the title of her poem 'Not Waving But Drowning' . The song premiered at 'The Beat Goes On' at the Royal Albert Hall in 2005, an event to celebrate the 40th anniversary of the 1965 International Poetry Incarnation at the same venue

Drowned In Sound suggested the album "is captivating, even if it's not all that it could be" with Popmatters review concluding that it's "an album that is extremely hard to get out of one's head indeed". and The Guardian chiming 'both beautiful and intense, her best album yet'

Track listing
 "Blue onto You" - 2:02
 "Let It Happen" - 3:35
 "Sustain Pedal" - 2:56
 "Stevie" - 3:03
 "Sandy L" - 3:53
 "When" - 3:52
 "Glass Bottom Boat" - 4:44
 "Hollow" - 3:31
 "Opened" - 2:27
 "Room in My Head" - 4:39

Personnel 
 Kathryn Williams – Vocals, Guitar, Piano, Organ, Percussion & Backing Vocals
 Laura Reid – Cello, Piano, Glockenspiel & Backing Vocals
 Kate St John – Oboe
 David Scott - Guitar
 Johnny Bridgwood – Double Bass
 Nell Catchpole – Viola
 Julia Singleton – Violin
 Stephen Morris – Violin
 Tim Weller – Drums
 Keith Morris – Bass Clarinet
 Peter Whyman – Clarinet
 Graham Hardy – Fluegelhorn & Trumpet
 Marcus Bates – French Horn
 Steve Honest – Pedal Steel Guitar
 Alex Tustin – Percussion
 Brendan Murphy – Vibraphone

Recording details 
 Kate St John – String, Woodwind, French Horn arrangements & backing vocals
 Produced by Darius Kedros & Kathryn Williams
 Management – Alan McGee, Creation Management
 Mastered by  Kevin Metcalfe

References 

2006 albums
Kathryn Williams albums